Tartamura is a genus of South American jumping spiders first described by A. A. Bustamante & Gustavo Rodrigo Sanches Ruiz in 2017. Tartamura was placed in the tribe Thiodinini, part of the Amycoida clade of the subfamily Salticinae in Maddison's 2015 classification of the family Salticidae.

Species
 it contains four species:
Tartamura adfectuosa (Galiano, 1977) — Argentina
Tartamura agatelin Bustamante & Ruiz, 2017 — Ecuador
Tartamura huao Bustamante & Ruiz, 2017 — Ecuador
Tartamura metzneri Bustamante & Ruiz, 2017 — Brazil

References

External links

Salticidae genera
Salticidae